Washington Township is one of thirteen townships in Fremont County, Iowa, United States.  As of the 2010 census, its population was 350 and it contained 155 housing units.

Geography

Cemeteries
The township contains Austin Cemetery, Baker Cemetery, Brown Cemetery, Buckham Cemetery, Frost Cemetery, Hamburg Cemetery, Lovelady Cemetery, Means Cemetery, Saint Marys Cemetery and Slusher Cemetery.

Transportation
 Interstate 29
 Iowa Highway 2
 Iowa Highway 333
 U.S. Route 275

School districts
 Hamburg Community School District
 Sidney Community School District

Political districts
 Iowa's 3rd congressional district
 State House District 23
 State Senate District 12

References

External links
 City-Data.com

Townships in Iowa
Townships in Fremont County, Iowa